Geng Jimao or Keng Chi-mao (died 1671) was a Chinese prince and military leader, inheriting the title  of "Jingnan Prince" (Jingnan wang [靖南王] meaning "Prince who pacifies the South") from his father Geng Zhongming, along with his lands, and passing it on, in his turn to his son Geng Jingzhong.

He led an army from the time of his father's suicide, fighting the Southern Ming, on behalf of the Qing dynasty.

The "Dolo efu" 和碩額駙 rank was given to husbands of Qing princesses. Geng Jingmao managed to have both his sons Geng Jingzhong and Geng Zhaozhong 耿昭忠 become court attendants under the Shunzhi Emperor and married Aisin Gioro women, with Prince Abatai's granddaughter marrying Geng Zhaozhong 耿昭忠 and Haoge's (a son of Hong Taiji) daughter marrying Geng Jingzhong. A daughter 和硕柔嘉公主 of the Manchu Aisin Gioro Prince Yolo 岳樂 (Prince An) was wedded to Geng Juzhong who was another son of Geng Jingmao.

References

Chinese military leaders
Qing dynasty generals
1671 deaths
Year of birth missing